Arkaim is an archaeological site, dated to  2050-1900 BCE, of an ancient fortified settlement, belonging to Sintashta culture, situated in the steppe of the Southern Urals,  north-northwest of the village of Amursky and  east-southeast of the village of Alexandrovsky in the Chelyabinsk Oblast of Russia, just north of the border with Kazakhstan.
It was discovered in 1987 by a team of archaeologists which later came under the leadership of Gennady Zdanovich. The realization of its importance unprecedentedly forestalled the planned flooding of the area for a reservoir. The construction of Arkaim is attributed to the early Proto-Indo-Iranian-speakers of the Sintashta culture, which some scholars believe represents the proto-Indo-Iranians before their split into different groups and migration to Central Asia and from there to Persia, India and other parts of Eurasia.

Name
The name "Arkaim" likely comes from the Turkic Arka, meaning "Ridge", "Back", or "Base". Its original name has not been preserved. There is a mountain three kilometres south of the site of the same name.

Discovery and salvage of the site

In the summer of 1987 a team of archaeologists headed by Gennady Zdanovich was sent to examine the archaeological value of the valley at the confluence of the Bolshaya Karaganka and Utyaganka rivers, in the south of Chelyabinsk Oblast or the Southern Ural region, where the construction of a reservoir had begun the previous autumn. Some archaeological sites in the area were already known, but they had yielded little and were not considered worthy of preservation. The site would have been flooded by the spring of 1988.

On June 20, two students who took part in the expedition, Aleksandr Voronkov and Aleksandr Ezril, informed the archaeologists about unusual embankments they had found in the steppe. The same evening Zdanovich announced the discovery. The latter would have proven a turning point in the debates about the original homeland of the Indo-Europeans and their migrations, which Soviet specialists had been bitterly disputing about since the 1970s. The near Sintashta culture, excavated in that decade, yielded the remains of an early chariot with horses, making apparent that the southern Urals had been a key location in the development of technology and complex civilisation. The discovery of Arkaim confirmed that assumption.

The struggle to rescue the site was difficult since the reservoir project was overseen by the then all-powerful Ministry of Water Resources of the Soviet Union. The project was scheduled for completion in 1989, but the builders intended to hasten the construction to have it built within the spring of 1988. The archaeologists did their best to mobilise public opinion for the rescue of Arkaim, initially requesting a halt of the project until 1990; academicians and public figures spoke out in their defense. In March 1989 the Praesidium of the Urals Branch of the Academy of Sciences of the Soviet Union formally established a scientific laboratory for the study of the ancient civilisation of Chelyabinsk Oblast. A request was made to the Council of Ministers of the Russian Federation to declare the site as a protected area of historical value.

In the following months the Ministry of Water Resources rapidly lost power as the Soviet Union moved towards collapse. In April 1991 the Council of Ministers officially cancelled the construction of the reservoir and declared Arkaim a "historical and geographical museum".

Structure of Arkaim

Arkaim was a circular stronghold consisting of two concentric bastions made of adobe with timber frames, and covered with unfired clay bricks. Within the circles, close to the bastions, sixty dwellings stood. The dwellings had hearths, cellars, wells and metallurgical furnaces. They opened towards an inner circular street paved with wood. The street was lined by a covered drainage gutter with pits for water collection. At the centre of the complex was a rectangular open space. The complex had four entrances, consisting of intricately constructed passages and oriented towards the cardinal points. According to historian V. A. Shnirelman, "All the evidence suggests that the settlement had been built to a common plan, which is indicative of a society with a developed social structure and local leaders with high authority."

Scholars have identified the structure of Arkaim as the cities built "reproducing the model of the universe" described in ancient Indo-Aryan/Iranian spiritual literature, the Vedas and the Avesta. The structure consists of three concentric rings of walls and three radial streets, possibly reflecting the city of King Yima described in the Rigveda. The foundation walls and the dwellings of the second ring are built according to what some researchers have described as 'swastika-like patterns'; the same symbol is found on various artifacts from the site.

The fortified citadel of Arkaim was previously dated to the 17th and 16th century BCE, but is currently considered to belong to c. 2050-1900 BCE, period of Sintashta culture. More than twenty other structures built according to similar patterns have been found in a larger area spanning from the southern Urals' region to the north of Kazakhstan, forming the so-called "Land of Towns".

Measures

The settlement was surrounded with a -deep moat.

There were four gates, the main was the western one. The dwellings of the outer ring were thirty-nine or forty, with doors opening towards the circular street.

Zdanovich estimates that approximately 1,500 to 2,500 people could have lived in Arkaim. Surrounding Arkaim's  walls, were arable fields, 130–140 metres by 45 metres (430–460 feet by 150 feet), irrigated by a system of canals and ditches.

Social impact

Religious movements and mysticism

The discovery of Arkaim reinvigorated the debate about the original homeland of the Indo-Europeans, seemingly confirming its location in Siberia. After their discovery, Arkaim and the Land of Towns have been interpreted by some as the "land of the Aryans", the centre of a statehood of a monarchical type, and ultimately the model for a new spiritual civilisation harmonised with the universe. Agencies related to the Russian Orthodox Church have been critical of such activities relating to Arkaim's archaeology.

The discovery of Arkaim and the Land of Towns has fueled the growth of schools of thought among Russian Rodnovers, Roerichians, Assianists, Zoroastrians, Hindus and others which regard the archaeological site as the second homeland of the Indo-Europeans, who originally dwelt in Arctic regions  and migrated southwards when the weather there became glacial, then spreading from Siberia to the south and the west, eventually developing into other civilisations. According to them, all Vedic knowledge originated in the southern Urals. Some of them identify Arkaim as the Asgard of Odin spoken of in Germanic mythology. The Russian Zoroastrian movement identifies Arkaim as the place where Zoroaster was born. Arkaim is designated as a "national and spiritual shrine" of Russia and has become a holy site for Rodnover, Zoroastrian and other religious movements.

Vladimir Putin's visit and the "Russian idea"
Russia's president Vladimir Putin visited the site in 2005, meeting in person with the chief archaeologist Gennady Zdanovich. The visit received much attention from Russian media. They presented Arkaim as the "homeland of the majority of contemporary people in Asia, and, partly, Europe". Zdanovich reportedly presented Arkaim to the president as a "possible national idea of Russia", which Shnirelman calls a new idea of a civilisation ― the "Russian idea".

See also

List of archaeoastronomical sites by country
History of human settlement in the Ural Mountains

References

Citations

Sources

External links
 Google Maps location

Archaeoastronomy
Archaeological sites in Russia
Bronze Age Asia
Nomadic groups in Eurasia
Former populated places in Russia
History of Ural
Indo-Iranian archaeological sites
Bronze Age Russia
Andronovo culture
Cultural heritage monuments in Chelyabinsk Oblast
Objects of cultural heritage of Russia of federal significance